The 1966 Mexican Grand Prix was a Formula One motor race held at the Ciudad Deportiva Magdalena Mixhuca on 23 October 1966. It was race 9 of 9 in both the 1966 World Championship of Drivers and the 1966 International Cup for Formula One Manufacturers. The race was the fifth Mexican Grand Prix and the first to be run under the new three-litre Formula.

The race was won by British driver John Surtees driving a Cooper T81-Maserati, his first victory since leaving Scuderia Ferrari to join Cooper. Surtees lead home reigning world champion Australian owner-driver Jack Brabham, driving a Brabham BT20-Repco, H by eight seconds. A lap down in third place, also driving a Brabham BT20, was Brabham's teammate New Zealander Denny Hulme.

Surtees's victory promoted him to second place in the championship, vaulting past Austrian driver Jochen Rindt of the Cooper works team.

Race report 

John Surtees dominated to take his first win since transferring from Ferrari to Cooper in mid season. He took the lead from Jack Brabham on lap 6 and was never challenged. With Jim Clark suffering gearbox problems and both BRMs retiring, Richie Ginther was the only contender left. However he too had mechanical problems, and dropped back. Brabham rallied at the end to close, but Surtees had lapped the entire field up to second. The first year of 3-litre engines had resulted in wins for five different makes of car, using five different engines.

Classification

Qualifying

Race

Championship standings after the race

Drivers' Championship standings

Constructors' Championship standings

 Notes: Only the top five positions are included for both sets of standings. Only the best 5 results counted towards the Championship. Numbers without parentheses are Championship points; numbers in parentheses are total points scored.

References

Mexican Grand Prix
Mexican Grand Prix
1966 in Mexican motorsport
October 1966 sports events in Mexico